Tyler Christopher may refer to:

Tyler Christopher (actor) (born 1972), American actor
Tyler Christopher (athlete) (born 1983), Canadian sprinter

See also
Christopher Tyler, visual psychophysicist